Draculin (named after Count Dracula) is a glycoprotein found in the saliva of vampire bats. It is a single-chain protein composed of 708 amino acids, weighing about 83 kDa. It functions as an anticoagulant, inhibiting coagulation factors IX (IXa) and X (Xa) by establishing rapid equilibrium with factor Xa, thus keeping the blood of the bitten victim from clotting while the bat is drinking. The activation of factor X is a common point between the intrinsic and extrinsic pathway of blood coagulation. Draculin is a member of the Lactoferrin family of proteins that functions as an antibacterial protein in other mammals, but has been co-opted in bat evolution to function as an anticoagulant.

Draculin is a noncompetitive inhibitor of FXa. The inhibition upon contact with the blood of the victim is immediate. Because of the immediate inhibition, the reaction is not readily reversible initially, but is a reversible reaction. It does not act on thrombin, trypsin or chymotrypsin and does not express fibrinolytic activity. The protein increases the lag phase as well as the height of the peak of thrombin generation when in plasma, leading to prolonged bleeding.

Daily salivation of vampire bats yields a saliva that progressively decreases in anticoagulant activity. However, there is no significant change in overall protein content during this time. After a 4-day period of rest, anticoagulant activity of the saliva is restored. In addition, purified native draculin, obtained from high- and low-activity saliva, shows significant differences in composition of the carbohydrate moiety, and glycosylation pattern. Furthermore, controlled chemical de-glycosylation of native draculin progressively leads to complete loss of the biological activity, despite the conditions leaving the polypeptide backbone intact.

Structure 
There are two different structural forms of draculin. However, the two forms do not significantly differ from the other. Both structures are able to and do bind to coagulation factors IXa and Xa. The main difference is evident in inhibition activity. One structural form will inhibit factor IXa and the other Xa. The inhibitory activity of one factor is not affected by the presence of the other.

See also 
 Desmoteplase

References

External links 

 
 
 

Anticoagulants
Glycoproteins
Vampire bats